Jalalabad (also Romanized as Jalālābād) is a village in Yazdanabad Rural District, Yazdanabad District, Zarand County, Kerman Province, Iran. At the 2006 census, its population was 1,902, in 443 families.

References 

Populated places in Zarand County